Milica Ostojić (Serbian Cyrillic: Милица Остојић, born 16 October 1991 in Belgrade, SR Serbia, SFR Yugoslavia) is a Serbian Olympic swimmer.

She represented Serbia at the 2008 Summer Olympics in Beijing, People's Republic of China. At only 16 years of age, she was the youngest member of the Serbian Olympic team.
She participated in one single event - the Women's 200 metre freestyle, in which she took 40th place overall among 46 competitors with a time of 2.03.19.

See also
 List of Serbian records in swimming

References

External links
 
 
 

1991 births
Living people
Sportspeople from Belgrade
Serbian female swimmers
Serbian female freestyle swimmers
Swimmers at the 2008 Summer Olympics
Olympic swimmers of Serbia